Yasuke is a Japanese-American original net anime series loosely based on the historical figure of the same name, an African warrior who served under Japanese daimyo Oda Nobunaga during the Sengoku period of samurai conflict in 16th century Japan. Created by LeSean Thomas and animated by Japanese animation studio MAPPA, the series stars Lakeith Stanfield as the titular character. The series was released on Netflix on April 29, 2021.

Synopsis
In an alternate-reality 16th century feudal Japan reimagined with magic and advanced technology, an African man named Yasuke went from being in the service of Jesuit missionaries during the Nanban trade to being a warrior and retainer in the service of Lord Oda Nobunaga. In the year 1582, he witnessed the fall of Nobunaga's forces in battle at Honnō-ji Temple against the army of the Dark General, who serves the demonic warlord Yami no Daimyō. With Nobunaga's death and the defeat of his forces, Yami no Daimyō assumes complete control of the land. Twenty years later, Yasuke tries to put his storied past as a legendary ronin known as the "Black Samurai" behind him and retires as a recluse boatman named Yassan at a remote village. He encounters a singer at a local bar named Ichika and later agrees to take her and her daughter Saki, a sick girl with mysterious magical powers, north to see a special doctor to help with Saki's condition. After an attack by mercenaries who are after Ichika and Saki, Yasuke is tasked with protecting Saki while coming to terms with his past, dealing with would-be conquerors of Japan, and facing dark supernatural elements as Yasuke and Saki find themselves in the middle of a struggle against the forces of Yami no Daimyō.

Characters
 
 
 Once a servant of Jesuits named Eusebio Ibrahimo Baloi and originally of Yao descent, he was named Yasuke upon becoming a samurai under Oda Nobunaga, after which his skill and honor earned much of his Lord's favor, despite the discrimination for his skin and distrust for his foreign origin. After serving as Nobunaga's kaishakunin following his defeat at Honnō-ji Temple, he escaped his bondage under the Jesuits and became a recluse working as a boatman ferrying people along the river he resides on. After 20 years in hiding, he reluctantly joins Saki on a quest after the pair cross paths against Abraham and the servants of the Yami no Daimyō.
 
 
 The historic warlord of Japan, that nearly succeeded in united Japan under his crest. Just as historically, Nobunaga scoffed at traditions to progress Japan under his rule, even bringing in Yasuke as a retainer. Nobunaga was also unabashed by his romantic love for Ranmaru.
 Saki
 
 Ichika's adopted daughter, rescued from Abraham as an infant. She possesses incredible mystical powers with the potential to rival the Yami no Daimyō as the villain's natural counterbalance.
 Natsumaru
 
Natsumaru was revealed to be a member of the Iga clan and also a spy for Hattori Hanzo within Nobunaga's ranks. Despite having an attraction for Yasuke, he discovers her secret and regretfully kills her amid the battle with Hanzo's army.
 Ichika
 
 A singer at an inn where she meets Yasuke, hiring him to take her and Saki to a doctor upriver.
 Morisuke
 
 The doctor who exclusively treats and trains Saki, as he shares similar powers. He was once a samurai in Nobunaga's forces, serving alongside Yasuke. He runs a school mentoring psychics and sees Saki as the chosen one to end the Yami no Daimyō.
 Ishikawa
 
 An assassin wielding a giant scythe and other knives, working for Abraham to fetch Saki. After aiding Yasuke and Morisuke, she dies when the Daimyō's personal army comes for Saki.
 Haruto
 
 A self-aware weaponized robot with humorous tendencies, working for Abraham to fetch Saki. After Ishikawa's death, he  strikes the Daimyō's forces in revenge.
 Nikita
 
 A Russian Werebear assassin working for Abraham to fetch Saki. After his death, she stops hunting Saki and helps Yasuke at Morisuke's temple. She sacrifices herself to buy time for Morisuke's forces to retreat, and for Yasuke to take Saki elsewhere.
 Achoja
 
 An African shaman originally from the Kingdom of Benin, he is hired by Abraham to capture Yasuke to find Saki. After Abraham's death, he and his party take their pay and he also develops a warrior's respect with Yasuke. He aids Morisuke's efforts against a monster of the Daimyō's and is richly rewarded, the only member of his group to survive after the end battle.
 Abraham
 
 A priest with mutant powers in service to the Catholic Church, aiming to take Saki to Europe and conquer the continent, then take the Church as its new leader. Yasuke and Saki kill him after both are captured by his hired assassins.
 Yami no Daimyō
 
 The dark mage who conquered a swath of Japan, who seeks to take Saki's power for herself, seeing her as a natural threat. In the last episode she was identified as Hojo Masako, a noble from Kamakura shogunate.

Production

Concept
According to series creator LeSean Thomas, he was inspired to learn more about Yasuke, regarded as the first foreign born warrior of African descent in Japanese samurai history, after seeing online images from the children's book  by Kurusu Yoshio in 2009. After the success of creating his first animated series Cannon Busters with Japanese animation studios Satelight and Yumeta Company, Thomas was approached by Netflix in 2017 to create future projects for the network. Thomas pitched three ideas to Netflix, with one of them being an action adventure anime series based the story of Yasuke.

Netflix greenlit the project with Thomas serving as showrunner of the series. Instead of a traditional historical anime series, the story was developed as a reimagined take of feudal Japan set in a world of science fiction and fantasy elements, such as magic and mecha, to set it apart from other  anime. According to Thomas, he felt restricted in the idea of doing a standard biopic, and he wanted to do a series with a sense of fantasy and romanticism like what was done with other figures in Japanese history, such as Yagyū Jūbei Mitsuyoshi. Nick Jones Jr., a lead writer for the series, has credited works such as Samurai 7, Rambo films, and Lone Wolf and Cub as influences to his writing. The series was developed with multiple seasons in mind.

Development
First announced in November 2018, Yasuke was developed with a writing team in the United States, and art, character design, and animation in Japan by studio MAPPA. LeSean Thomas, actor Lakeith Stanfield, musical artist Steven Ellison a.k.a. Flying Lotus, and manager/producer Colin Stark are the executive producers of the project with Matthew Shattuck serving as a producer. Both Stanfield and Flying Lotus contributed ideas to the project such as Yasuke's backstory involving trauma and mental health, additional characters for the series, and story elements involving the supernatural. Stanfield voices Yasuke in the English version while Japanese/African American actor and television personality Jun Soejima voices Yasuke in the Japanese version.

Takeru Satō is the chief episode director of the series with Satoshi Iwataki as chief animation director, Junichi Higashi as art director, Yuki Nomoto as the director of 3DCG, and Hyo-Gyu Park as director of photography. The character designs for the series were created by director and animator Takeshi Koike with Kenichi Shima serving as sub character designer. Recording for the English cast was done at recording studio NYAV Post in New York City.

Music
In addition to serving as an executive producer and as part of the creative team, Flying Lotus also composed the soundtrack for the series. "Black Gold", written and produced by Flying Lotus and performed by Thundercat, is the opening theme for the series, and the ending theme is "Between Memories" by Flying Lotus, featuring Niki Randa and Thundercat. Each theme was featured in five of the six episodes. Instead of going for a more straightforward hip hop or jazz focused soundtrack like Samurai Champloo and Cowboy Bebop, Flying Lotus went for an organic take with the music being made in chronological order to reflect the main character's progression in the story. Flying Lotus stated that he went for a more synthesizer-inspired sound mixed with Japanese percussion, African percussion, and hip-hop elements.

Manga adaptation
A manga adaptation by Satoshi Okunishi was serialized in Shogakukan's seinen manga magazine Monthly Big Comic Spirits from July 27, 2021, to June 27, 2022; An additional chapter was published on July 27 of the same year. Shogakukan released the first tankōbon volume on July 29, 2022.

Episodes

Soundtrack album

Yasuke (2021)

Yasuke is the soundtrack album and original score by Flying Lotus, created for the series. It was released on April 30, 2021 through Warp Records and features appearances by Thundercat, Denzel Curry, and Niki Randa.

Charts

Critical reception
 On Rotten Tomatoes, 93% of 27 ratings are positive, and the average rating is 6.60/10 garnering the series critical praise. The consensus for the series states: "Anchored by an impressive voice cast led by a solid Lakeith Stanfield, Yasukes expertly crafted, gorgeously animated blend of fantasy and history is an epic ode to the titular samurai."

James Poniewozik praised both the animation and score, but argued that "the quieter and more novel aspects... get drowned out by its louder, less distinctive action story lines."

Accolades 
Yasuke was nominated for Outstanding Animated Series for the 53rd NAACP Image Awards.

Notes

References

External links
 
 
 

2021 American television series debuts
2021 anime ONAs
2020s adult animated television series
2020s American black cartoons
Alternate history anime and manga
Anime with original screenplays
Black characters in animation
Cultural depictions of Akechi Mitsuhide
Cultural depictions of Oda Nobunaga
English-language Netflix original programming
Feudal Japan in fiction
Flying Lotus
Historical fantasy anime and manga
MAPPA
Netflix original anime
Samurai in anime and manga
Science fiction anime and manga
Seinen manga
Sengoku period in fiction
Shogakukan manga